SONIFI Incorporated, previously SONIFI Solutions, is an interactive content and connectivity provider. The company serves approximately 1.4 million hotel rooms worldwide in addition to healthcare facilities throughout the United States with core services that include interactive television, broadband, connectivity, and advertising along with nationwide technical and professional support services.

The company's corporate headquarters are in Los Angeles, California and the primary operations center is in Sioux Falls, South Dakota. The company also maintains offices in Silicon Valley as well as offices in Canada and Mexico and a network of field service facilities serving the company's customers throughout the United States and Canada. SONIFI's primary customer base is in the continental United States, and they also deliver services in Canada, Mexico and 15 other countries through relationships with local licensees. As LodgeNet, it had a long-standing partnership with Nintendo, and has brought Nintendo console titles to hotel rooms since the Super Nintendo Entertainment System.

History 

SONIFI Solutions was founded in 1980 as Satellite Movie Company. The company was renamed LodgeNet Entertainment Corporation in 1991 and became a publicly traded corporation in 1993. LodgeNet purchased The Hotel Networks, On Command, and Stay Online corporations in 2006 and 2007, and changed its name to LodgeNet Interactive Corporation in 2008.

In late 1993, LodgeNet launched its on-demand hospitality service, including worldwide delivery of Super NES games to hotel guests via its proprietary building-wide networks.  LodgeNet eventually reported the system being installed in 200,000 hotel guest rooms by April 1996, and 530,000 guest rooms by mid-1999. By April 1996, LodgeNet reported that its partnership with Nintendo to deliver Super NES games had yielded 200,000 worldwide hotel guest room installations. On June 16, 1998, Nintendo and LodgeNet entered a 10-year licensing agreement for an "aggressive" upgrade to add Nintendo 64 support to their existing 500,000 Super NES equipped guest room installations.  LodgeNet says that within the system's previous five years to date, the system had "caused Nintendo to become the most successful new product rollout in the history of the hotel pay-per-view industry". LodgeNet reported that within the middle of 1998 alone, 35 million hotel guests encountered the Nintendo name as an integral amenity, and it reported sales of more than 54 million minutes of Nintendo-based gameplay.

On June 10, 1999, LodgeNet and Nintendo began expanding and upgrading their existing Super NES buildout to include Nintendo 64 support.  In mid-1999, LodgeNet reported that its 530,000 hotel room installations were increasing at a rate of 11,000 rooms per month. In September 2000, Nintendo and LodgeNet began delivering newly released Nintendo 64 games to hotel rooms at more than 1,000 hotel sites, concurrently with the games' retail releases, demonstrating "the capacity to update [LodgeNet's] interactive digital systems with fresh content virtually overnight".

On December 31, 2012, LodgeNet announced its intention to file for a prepackaged Chapter 11 bankruptcy as part of a recapitalization that would give control of the company to Colony Capital, a global investment firm with $38 billion in assets under management and a broad range of hospitality and media industry investments. The commencement of these proceedings was announced on January 28, 2013. During this period the company also announced that Colony had signed a memorandum of understanding with DirecTV under which LodgeNet and DIRECTV would operate as strategic partners within the hospitality and healthcare markets. The agreement extended the parties' current free-to-guest programming agreement to include DIRECTV branding, programming and content, advertising and other operational support.

On March 28, 2013, Colony announced that it had completed the acquisition, concurrent with an approximately $70 million recapitalization of the company and a new $358 million long term credit facility. The investor syndicate led by Colony was issued new common stock representing 100% ownership of the company. This completed the company's emergence from Chapter 11. In the same announcement, hospitality industry veteran Mike Ribero was named the company's new CEO. Tom Storey is the president of hospitality, Ed Kaufman is general counsel, and John Chang is the chief financial officer, completing the current executive management team.

The company officially became SONIFI Solutions on June 25, 2013, with an announcement at the HITEC trade show. In January 2020, its corporate entity became SONIFI Incorporated.

Games
Games are offered for three Nintendo platforms, the Super Nintendo Entertainment System, the Nintendo 64, and the GameCube, with support for the Nintendo Entertainment System planned.

Super Nintendo Entertainment System
There were 49 Super Nintendo Entertainment System titles available to play on LodgeNet hotel televisions and on airlines equipped with Nintendo Gateway System, which LodgeNet used for their hotel service. Some titles were not playable on airlines.

Blackthorne
Boogerman: A Pick and Flick Adventure (not available on airlines)
Boxing Legends of the Ring
The Brainies
ClayFighter: Tournament Edition (not available on airlines)
ClayFighter 2: Judgment Clay (not available on airlines)
Claymates
Donkey Kong Country
Donkey Kong Country 2: Diddy's Kong Quest (not available on airlines)
Dr. Mario (standalone, exclusive to the service)
Final Fight
F-Zero
Hagane: The Final Conflict
Hal's Hole in One Golf
Hangman (exclusive to the service)
Killer Instinct (not available on airlines)
Kirby's Dream Course
The Legend of Zelda: A Link to the Past
The Lost Vikings
The Lost Vikings 2
Mega Man X
NCAA Basketball (listed in a Nintendo Power article about the Gateway Service, unknown availability)
Noughts & Crosses (exclusive to the service)
Panel de Pon
Postcard Puzzle (exclusive to the service)
Prehistorik Man
Pro Mahjong Kiwame
Shanghai II: Dragon's Eye
Street Fighter II: The World Warrior
Street Fighter II: Hyper Fighting (not available on airlines)
Super Adventure Island
Super Bonk
Super Ghouls 'n Ghosts
Super Mario All-Stars
Super Mario All-Stars + Super Mario World (unknown availability)
Super Mario World
Super Metroid (not available on airlines)
Super Play Action Football
Super Punch-Out!!
Super Soccer
Super Solitaire
Super Street Fighter II (not available on airlines)
Super Tennis
T&E True Golf Classics: Pebble Beach (listed in a Nintendo Power article about the Gateway Service, unknown availability)
Tetris (standalone, exclusive to the service)
Tetris Attack
Tetris & Dr. Mario
Vegas Stakes
Wario's Woods

Nintendo 64
There were 38 Nintendo 64 titles available to play on LodgeNet hotel televisions.

1080° Snowboarding
Donkey Kong 64
Dr. Mario 64
Excitebike 64
Extreme-G
F-Zero X
Forsaken 64
Gauntlet Legends
Hydro Thunder
Iggy's Reckin' Balls
Kirby 64: The Crystal Shards
The Legend of Zelda: Majora's Mask
The Legend of Zelda: Ocarina of Time
Mario Golf
Mario Kart 64
Mario Party 3
Mario Tennis
Midway's Greatest Arcade Hits
Milo's Astro Lanes
Mortal Kombat 4
Namco Museum 64
The New Tetris
Paper Mario
Pilotwings 64
Pokémon Snap
Rampage 2: Universal Tour
Ready 2 Rumble Boxing
Rush 2: Extreme Racing USA
San Francisco Rush: Extreme Racing
Star Fox 64
Star Wars: Rogue Squadron
Super Mario 64
Super Smash Bros.
Turok 2: Seeds of Evil
Virtual Chess 64
Virtual Pool 64
Wave Race 64
Yoshi's Story

GameCube
There were 43 Nintendo GameCube titles available to play on LodgeNet hotel televisions.

1080° Avalanche
Animal Crossing
Backyard Baseball 2007
Battalion Wars
Chibi-Robo!
Custom Robo
Eternal Darkness: Sanity's Requiem
Final Fantasy Crystal Chronicles
Fire Emblem: Path of Radiance
Geist
Kirby Air Ride
The Legend of Zelda: Collector's Edition
The Legend of Zelda: Four Swords Adventures
The Legend of Zelda: Ocarina of Time Master Quest
The Legend of Zelda: Twilight Princess
The Legend of Zelda: The Wind Waker
Luigi's Mansion
Mario Golf: Toadstool Tour
Mario Kart: Double Dash!!
Mario Party 4
Mario Party 5
Mario Party 6
Mario Party 7
Mario Power Tennis
Metroid Prime
Metroid Prime 2: Echoes
Paper Mario: The Thousand-Year Door
Pikmin
Pikmin 2
Pokémon Channel
Pokémon Colosseum
Pokémon XD: Gale of Darkness
Star Fox: Assault
Star Wars Rogue Squadron II: Rogue Leader
Star Wars Rogue Squadron III: Rebel Strike
Super Mario Strikers
Super Mario Sunshine
TMNT
Tomb Raider: Legend
The Urbz: Sims in the City
Wario World
WarioWare, Inc.: Mega Party Games!
Wave Race: Blue Storm

See also 
 Nintendo 64 controller#LodgeNet variant
 Interactive television
 Smart TV
 Nintendo Gateway System

Notes

References 

Television technology
Mass media companies established in 1980
Companies formerly listed on the Nasdaq